Mind Elevation is the fourth studio album by Nightmares on Wax. It was released in 2002 on Warp. It peaked at number 47 on the UK Albums Chart.

Critical reception

At Metacritic, which assigns a weighted average score out of 100 to reviews from mainstream critics, the album received an average score of 65, based on 13 reviews, indicating "generally favorable reviews".

Track listing

Charts

References

External links
 

2002 albums
Nightmares on Wax albums
Warp (record label) albums